Roger Rose (born August 15, 1958) is an American actor and former VH1 VJ, known for such films as Ski Patrol and for voice work in animated films and television series such as Happy Feet, Rugrats, Scooby-Doo, The Grim Adventures of Billy and Mandy, and Quack Pack. He is also an occasional announcer.

Career
His first live role was in an episode of Buck Rogers in the 25th Century. He auditioned at Rod Roddy's podium in 2004 for the announcing job on television's longest running game show, The Price Is Right, and was the announcer for the show's ceremonial 6,000th episode.

He starred in Ski Patrol (1990) and produced and acted in Comic Book: The Movie (2004). He voices on-air promos for most Major Television networks. He was the in-show Announcer for the Emmy Awards hosted by Jane Lynch on Fox.  He voiced both the Dark Fiend Charles the 3rd and Aquatic Terror Gran Bruce in the video game Viewtiful Joe (2003). Some of his notable anime roles include several minor characters of Zatch Bell!. He also did the voice of Garbel of Manicuria on Bobobo-bo Bo-bobo. He currently is doing promos for TV shows such as Ugly Betty and Hannah Montana "NCIS" "Big Bang". He has also done a David Letterman impression on several animated series, such as Tiny Toons and Animaniacs. Most recently in 2009, he voiced Doctor Strange on The Super Hero Squad Show and Superman on Batman: The Brave and the Bold. He has narrated documentaries for Animal Planet, (Discovery) and (National Geographic). Rose also announced the 2011 Emmy Awards.

He can be heard on WLS-TV in Chicago, (WLNY) in New York City, and KGO-TV in the San Francisco Bay Area.

Personal life
He is the son of Hilly Rose, a radio personality in Los Angeles, and Sondra B. Gair, a pioneer radio interviewer with Chicago Public Radio. His brother was Judd Rose, of ABC.

Filmography

Film

Television

Video Games

References

External links

Living people
American male film actors
American male television actors
American male video game actors
American male voice actors
Game show announcers
Lee Strasberg Theatre and Film Institute alumni
Place of birth missing (living people)
20th-century American male actors
21st-century American male actors
VH1 people
1958 births